CenturyTel of San Marcos, Inc. is a telephone operating company providing local telephone services in Texas owned by CenturyLink.

The company was founded as San Marcos Telephone Company in 1952. It was acquired by Century Telephone, now CenturyLink, in 1993 and absorbed into a company Century Telephone created which was named  Century Telephone of San Marcos, Inc. The company's name was later changed to CenturyTel of San Marcos, Inc.

References

Lumen Technologies 
Communications in Texas
Telecommunications companies of the United States
Telecommunications companies established in 1992
American companies established in 1992 
1992 establishments in Texas